Bouchetispiridae  is a part of the Gastropoda (Snails And Slugs) group, The genus Bouchetispira is the only genus in the family Bouchetispiridae (a monotypic family).The scientific name of the family and the generic name is in honour of Philippe Bouchet, the French taxonomist and malacologist.

References

External links
 Kantor, Y. I.; Strong, E. E.; Puillandre, N. (2012). A new lineage of Conoidea (Gastropoda: Neogastropoda) revealed by morphological and molecular data. Journal of Molluscan Studies. 78(3): 246-255

 
Conoidea
Monogeneric mollusc families
Gastropod families